Chloe Maggie Kelly (born 15 January 1998) is an English professional footballer who plays as a forward for Manchester City in the FA WSL and the England national team. She previously played for Arsenal and Everton and represented England on the under-17, under-19 and under-20 national teams.

At the UEFA Women's Euro 2022 Kelly came off the substitutes' bench to score the winning goal in the final, securing the team their first major trophy.

Early life
Born on 15 January 1998 to Jane and Noel Kelly and raised in West London district of Hanwell and the youngest of seven siblings, Kelly began playing football at a young age with her five brothers. Before joining Arsenal's Centre of Excellence, she played for Queens Park Rangers. She travelled two hours round trip by train as a young teenager to train with Arsenal. Her footballing idol when she was growing-up was Bobby Zamora, once also a Queens Park Rangers player.

Club career

Arsenal
On 23 July 2015, aged 17, Kelly made her full debut for the Arsenal first team in the Continental Cup against Watford, scoring her first goal just 22 minutes into the match. She made her second appearance for the club during a 2–1 win over Notts County, subbing in for Rachel Yankey in the 54th minute.

In February 2016, Kelly signed her first senior contract. She made one appearance in the team's 5–1 win over Sunderland on 25 June, before being loaned to FA WSL 2 side Everton.

After returning to Arsenal in October of the same year, she made three more appearances for Arsenal during the 2016 FA WSL season. The team finished the regular season in third place with a  record. Arsenal also won the 2016 FA Women's Cup Final at Wembley Stadium. Though Kelly was in the squad, she did not play during the team's 1–0 win over Chelsea.

In February 2017, Kelly signed a new contract with Arsenal. She made seven appearances for the club and scored two goals before being loaned to Everton in July.

Everton (loan) 
In June 2016, Kelly joined FA WSL 2 side Everton on a three-month loan in order to gain additional first team experience;. She made nine starts for the Toffees, and scored two goals.

In July 2017, Kelly returned to newly-promoted FA WSL 1 Everton for a second loan spell. Kelly made four appearances for Everton and scored two goals in the remaining months of 2017.

In the WSL Cup, Kelly scored her first senior hat-trick on 16 November 2017 in a 4–0 victory against Oxford United.

Everton

In January 2018, Kelly made a permanent transfer to Everton on contract through summer 2020, alongside Arsenal teammate Taylor Hinds. She made a total of 15 appearances for Everton during the 2017-18 FA WSL season and scored two goals. Everton finished in ninth place with a  record. During the 2018-19 FA WSL season, Kelly made eleven appearances and scored a goal during the team's 3–3 draw against Brighton & Hove Albion despite playing on an ankle injury throughout the season. Everton finished in 10th place.

After having ankle surgery, 2019 marked a turning point for Kelly's career. She scored nine goals in 12 games for Everton during the  2019-20 FA WSL season helping the club climb the table to sixth place. She was the fourth-highest scorer in the league and the top goalscorer for Everton. During the team's second game of the season, Kelly scored a brace lifting Everton to a 2–0 win. Her second goal of the match – a long-range goal – went viral. Kelly was named the league's Player of the Month for September and was shortlisted for October’s award. Kelly's performance during the early part of the season earned her a call-up to the national team camp.  In January 2020, Kelly scored a hat trick against Reading lifting Everton to a 3–1 win. It was the first hat-trick by an Everton player since 2013.

In June 2020, Kelly left Everton after rejecting a new contract.

Manchester City
On 3 July 2020, it was announced Kelly had signed a two-year contract with Manchester City. In September 2020, she was named to the PFA WSL Team of the Year. On 4 October, she scored a brace against Tottenham Hotspur lifting the team to a 4–1 win. During the team's 3–1 loss to Chelsea a few days later, she converted a penalty kick in the 73rd minute for Manchester City's lone goal of the match.

On 2 May 2021, Kelly suffered an ACL injury.

International career 
Kelly has represented England on the senior national team as well as numerous youth national teams, including the under-17 and under-20 squads.

Youth
In 2014, Kelly competed at the 2014 UEFA Women's Under-17 Championship in England. In November 2015, she scored an equaliser against Italy to earn a draw.

In August 2018, Kelly was part of the England U20 squad that claimed bronze at the 2018 FIFA U-20 Women's World Cup.

Senior 
Kelly made her senior national team debut in November 2018, coming in as a substitute in a 3–0 friendly win over Austria in Vienna.

Kelly was named in the England squad for UEFA Women's Euro 2022, which England was hosting, in June 2022. On 31 July 2022, Kelly came off the bench to score the winning goal in the 110th minute of the Women's Euro 2022 final match against Germany, securing the win for England in extra time. Once she was confirmed onside, she celebrated by removing her shirt and swinging it around her head, revealing a sports bra and receiving a yellow card as a result. She was later praised as uniting and empowering women. Kelly's celebration was compared to that of American defender Brandi Chastain, who had also famously celebrated a major championship-deciding goal for a host nation by removing her jersey and revealing her sports bra and had also been celebrated as a women's empowerment figure – in Chastain's case, after she scored the winning penalty for the United States against China in the 1999 Women's World Cup Final at the Rose Bowl. Chastain congratulated her and also said it put "a big smile on my face" and also later swapped shirts with Kelly after England's friendly against the United States at Wembley that October.

Career statistics

Club

International 

Scores and results list England's goal tally first, score column indicates score after each Kelly goal.

Honours
Manchester City
Women's FA Cup: 2019–20
FA Women's League Cup: 2021–22

England U20
FIFA U-20 Women's World Cup third place: 2018

England

UEFA Women's Championship: 2022
Arnold Clark Cup: 2023

Individual
FA WSL PFA Team of the Year: 2019–20, 2020–21
FA WSL Player of the Month: September 2019
FA WSL Top Assist Provider: 2020–21
Arnold Clark Cup Golden Boot: 2023
Freedom of the City of London (announced 1 August 2022)

See also 
 List of England women's international footballers
 List of UEFA Women's Championship goalscorers
 List of FA WSL hat-tricks

References

External links

 Manchester City player profile
 England player profile
 
 Everton player profile
 
 

1998 births
Living people
English women's footballers
England women's international footballers
Women's Super League players
Arsenal W.F.C. players
Everton F.C. (women) players
Women's association football forwards
Manchester City W.F.C. players
UEFA Women's Euro 2022 players
Footballers from Hanwell
UEFA Women's Championship-winning players